Ammonium orthomolybdate is the inorganic compound with the chemical formula (NH4)2MoO4.  It is a white solid that is prepared by treating molybdenum trioxide with aqueous ammonia.  Upon heating these solutions, ammonia is lost, to give ammonium heptamolybdate ((NH4)6Mo7O24.4H2O).

Uses
Ammonium orthomolybdate is used as a corrosion inhibitor and is an intermediate in some schemes to win molybdenum from its ores.  It is also used for decorating ceramics, and for colorimetric analysis of phosphates and arsenates.

Chemical reactions
Heating ammonium orthomolybdate solid or treatment with acid gives molybdenum trioxide. Such reactions proceed via ammonium dimolybdate. This equilibrium is exploited in the purification of molybdenum from its ores.  Aqueous solutions of ammonium orthomolybdate react with hydrogen sulfide to give ammonium tetrathiomolybdate:
 (NH4)2MoO4  +  4 H2S   →    (NH4)2MoS4  +  4 H2O
It reacts with arsenic acid upon heating to form a canary yellow precipitate of ammonium α-Keggin molybdoarsenate.
 (NH4)2MoO4 + H3AsO4  →  (NH4)2[As(Mo3O10)4] + 21NH4NO3 + 12H2O

References

Ammonium compounds
Molybdates